Ophiusa parcemacula is a moth of the family Erebidae. It is found in New Guinea, New Caledonia and the northern half of Australia.

The wingspan is about 60 mm.

The larvae feed on Loranthaceae and Melaleuca quinquenervia.

External links
Australian Caterpillars

Ophiusa
Moths described in 1891